The Commonwealth Turf Cup is an American Thoroughbred horse race held each year since 2015 at Laurel Park in Laurel, Maryland. It was previously known as the Colonial Turf Cup when it was held at Colonial Downs race track in New Kent County, Virginia. It is raced on turf at a distance of one mile and is open to horses aged three years old and up. The current purse is $200,000.

In 2009, the race was upgraded from a Grade III to a Grade II event. In 2011, the race changed its conditions to allow entry of older horses. This change caused the race to lose its graded status until 2013, when it again became a Grade II event.

From 2005 to 2013, the race was run at  miles. For the 2015 renewal, the distance was shortened to  miles, and in 2016 to 1 mile.

Records 
Fastest time: 
  miles : 1:52.98 Showing Up (2006)

Most wins by an owner:
 1 – No owner has won the Colonial Turf Cup more than once

Most wins by a jockey:
 1 – No jockey has won the Colonial Turf Cup more than once

Most wins by a Trainer:
 2 – Todd Pletcher (2005, 2012)

Winners of the Commonwealth Turf Cup

References

 Colonial Turf Cup Information on Colonial Downs website about the Colonial Turf Cup

Graded stakes races in the United States
Flat horse races for three-year-olds
Horse races in the United States
Turf races in the United States
Recurring sporting events established in 2005
2005 establishments in Maryland